Novodrachyonino is a rural locality (a settlement) in Novodrachyoninsky Selsoviet, Zarinsky District, Altai Krai, Russia. The population was 728 as of 2013. There are 10 streets.

Geography 
Novodrachyonino is located 34 km northeast of Zarinsk (the district's administrative centre) by road. Avdeyevskaya Baza is the nearest rural locality.

References 

Rural localities in Zarinsky District